Duchess of Cumberland is the principal courtesy title held by the wife of the Duke of Cumberland. So far only one woman has been Duchess of Cumberland alone but another has been Duchess of Cumberland & Strathearn and three more have been Duchess of Cumberland & Teviotdale. The latter title has been vacant since the dukedom's suspension in 1919.

Countesses of Cumberland (England, 1525-1643) 
Subsidiary title: Baroness de Clifford.

Duchesses of Cumberland (England, 1689–1702) 
Subsidiary titles: Countess of Kendal, Baroness Okingham.

| Anne of EnglandHouse of Stuart1689–1702
| 
| 6 February 1665St James's Palace, Westminster–daughter of James, Duke of York and Anne Hyde
| 28 July 1683Prince George of Denmark5 children
| 1 August 1714aged 49
|-
|}

Duchesses of Cumberland & Strathearn (Great Britain, 1766–1790) 
Subsidiary titles: Countess of Dublin

| Anne HortonLuttrell family1771–1790
| 
| 24 January 1743Marylebone, London–daughter of Simon Luttrell and Judith Lawes.
| 2 October 1771Prince Henry FrederickNo children
| 28 December 1808aged 49
|-
|}

Duchesses of Cumberland & Teviotdale (Great Britain, 1799–1919) 
Other titles: Queen of Hanover, Countess of Armagh

| Frederica of Mecklenburg-StrelitzHouse of Mecklenburg-Strelitz1815–1841
| 
| 3 March 1778Hanover–daughter of Grand Duke Charles II and Princess Friederike of Hesse-Darmstadt
| 29 August 1815The Prince Ernest Augustus1 child
| 29 June 1841aged 63
|-
| Marie of Saxe-AltenburgHouse of Saxe-Altenburg1851–1878
| 
| 14 April 1818Hildburghausen, Saxe-Hildburghausen–daughter of Duke Joseph and Duchess Amelia of Württemberg
| 18 February 1843George, Crown Prince of Hanover3 children
| 9 January 1907aged 88
|-
| Princess Thyra of DenmarkHouse of Glücksburg1878–1919
| 
| 29 September 1853Yellow Palace, Copenhagen–daughter of King Christian IX and Louise of Hesse-Kassel
| 21 December 1878Prince Ernest Augustus6 children
| 14 November 1923aged 78
|-
|}

Duchesses in pretence since 1919 

1923–1953: Princess Victoria Louise of Prussia (1892–1980), married Ernest Augustus III (1887–1953) in 1913.
1953–1980: Princess Ortrud of Schleswig-Holstein-Sonderburg-Glücksburg (1925–1980), married Ernest Augustus IV (1914–1987) in 1951.
1981-1987: Countess Monika zu Solms-Laubach (1929-2015), married Ernest Augustus IV in 1981.
1987–1997: Chantal Hochuli (b. 1955), married Ernest Augustus V (b.1954) in 1981, divorced in 1997.
1999–present: Princess Caroline of Monaco (b. 1957), married Ernest Augustus V in 1999.

References